I Need a Man may refer to:

"I Need a Man" (Eurythmics song)
"I Need a Man" (Miami Sound Machine song)
"I Need a Man" (Foxy Brown song)
"I Need a Man" (Grace Jones song)
"I Need a Man" (Manhattan Transfer song)